The 2018 National Premier Leagues Grand Final was the sixth National Premier Leagues Grand Final, It was played on the 30 September 2018 at Steve Woodcock Sports Centre in Adelaide between Campbelltown City and Lions FC. Campbelltown won 2–1 to secure their first National Premier Leagues title.

Route to the final
This is the how the two teams qualified for the Grand Final.

Match

Details

Statistics

References

2010s in South Australia
September 2018 sports events in Australia
Soccer in Adelaide
2018 in Australian soccer
Grand finals